Lawrence Bell (31 December 1872 – 7 April 1945), sometimes known as Laurie Bell or Lawrie Bell, was a Scottish professional footballer who played as a centre forward and outside right. He is most notable for his time in the Football League with The Wednesday and Bolton Wanderers. He represented the Scottish League XI.

Club career
Bell began his playing career with hometown Scottish League club Dumbarton in 1892, before transferring to Third Lanark in 1894. After joining First Division club The Wednesday in 1895, he played the remainder of his career in England. In his first season with The Wednesday, Bell was a member of the club's FA Cup-winning team. After departing Olive Grove in 1897 and then spending two seasons with Everton (one playing alongside his elder brother Jack, previously also a Dumbarton teammate), Bell's most successful goalscoring period came with First Division club Bolton Wanderers, for whom he scored 45 goals in 103 appearances between 1899 and 1903. After leaving Burnden Park, he ended his career with spells at Brentford and West Bromwich Albion.

Representative career 
Bell scored on his only appearance for the Scottish League XI, in a 4–1 victory over their Irish counterparts on 2 February 1895.

Personal life 
Bell was the younger brother of Scottish international Jack Bell.

Honours 
Dumbarton
 Dumbartonshire Cup: 1892–93, 1893–94

The Wednesday
 FA Cup: 1895–96

Career statistics

References

1872 births
1945 deaths
Sportspeople from Dumbarton
Footballers from West Dunbartonshire
Scottish footballers
Association football outside forwards
Dumbarton F.C. players
Third Lanark A.C. players
Sheffield Wednesday F.C. players
Everton F.C. players
Bolton Wanderers F.C. players
Brentford F.C. players
West Bromwich Albion F.C. players
Hibernian F.C. players
Scottish Football League players
English Football League players
Place of death missing
Scottish Football League representative players
FA Cup Final players

Southern Football League players